The Wheel is an Australian Country music band. Their albums  The Wheel and Good Noise were nominated for the 1996 and 1998 ARIA Awards for Best Country Album.

Band members
Mick Albeck
Kim Cheshire
Mitch Farmer
Jeff McCormack 
Rod McCormack

Discography

Albums

Awards and nominations

ARIA Awards
The ARIA Music Awards is an annual awards ceremony that recognises excellence, innovation, and achievement across all genres of Australian music.

|-
| ARIA Music Awards of 1996
| The Wheel
| ARIA Award for Best Country Album
| 
|-
| ARIA Music Awards of 1998
| 'Good Noise 
| ARIA Award for Best Country Album
| 
|-

Country Music Awards of Australia
The Country Music Awards of Australia (CMAA) (also known as the Golden Guitar Awards) is an annual awards night held in January during the Tamworth Country Music Festival, celebrating recording excellence in the Australian country music industry. They have been held annually since 1973.

|-
| 1996
| The Wheel for "I Fell in Love"
| Vocal Group or Duo of the Year
| 
|-
| 1997
| The Wheel for "Saw You Runnin'"
| Vocal Group or Duo of the Year
| 

 Note: wins only

References

Australian country music groups